Ossett United Football Club is a football club based in Ossett, West Yorkshire, England.

History 
The Formation of Ossett United

Ossett United was created on 1 June 2018 following the merger of Ossett Town A.F.C. (est. 1936) and Ossett Albion A.F.C. (est. 1944). Both Ossett Town and Ossett Albion had managed to gain and maintain Northern Premier League status. 

Early History

The two clubs merged under the leadership of a new board brought together from the two previous clubs. The founding directors were John Chidlaw (OA), James Rogers (OT), Emma Chidlaw (OA), Dawn Rogers (OT), Lee Summerscales (OA) and Lee Broadbent (OT) forming the new Board with support from Phil Smith as CEO. John Chidlaw took on the role of Chairman for the first season. The Club made its new home Ingfield, the previous home of Ossett Town, and used Dimple Wells, the previous home of Ossett Albion, as its Ladies and Academy Team base. 

In the first year (2018/19), attendances significantly increased from what either club had experienced previously, coupled with success on the pitch by reaching the play-off semi-final and winning the County Cup under the guidance of manager Andy Welsh. By the end of the 2018/19 season, Phil Smith had taken on the mantle of club chairman following a number of board changes. 

Wayne Benn took up the managerial reigns in late 2019 following a poor start to the 2019/20 season; however, that season was ended abruptly in March 2020 with the onset of COVID-19. The season was null and voided. In November of 2019, Ossett United faced a court case dating back to a tackle in 2015 when Ossett Town were playing Radcliffe Borough, which was lost with United facing legal and damages costs amounting to £135,000. The club received a loan from two of its closest supporters to avoid the club going into liquidation or selling the Ingfield ground. 

The 2020/21 season started late due to the ongoing pandemic and finished with only eight league games having been played by United. This time the season was curtailed rather than null and voided. Off the pitch, Rogers and Smith swapped roles due to Smith's work commitments and Rogers took on the role as Chairman, a role he had previously held at Ossett Town. 2020 also saw the club declare Dimple Wells surplus to requirements and make arrangements to surrender the lease, making Ingfield the single home pitch of the club.

Honours 
West Riding County Cup: Winners, 2018-19

Current squad

Records 

Best League Position: 5th in Northern Premier League Division One East, 2018-19
Best FA Cup Performance: Second Qualifying Round, 2019-20
Best FA Trophy Performance: Second Qualifying Round, 2018–19
Record League Attendance: 1005 vs Liversedge, 15 October 2021
Record Cup Attendance: 1,118 vs AFC Guiseley, West Riding County Cup Final, 9 April 2019

References 

Football clubs in England
Football clubs in West Yorkshire
Association football clubs established in 2018
2018 establishments in England
Northern Premier League clubs